Al-Burūj ("The Great Star") is the eighty-fifth chapter (surah) of the Quran, with 22 ayat or verses. The word "Al-Burooj" in the first verse is usually translated as 'stars', or more specifically, 'great stars'. The word Al-Burooj is the plural of Burj, which means fort or tower; something that can be seen from a distance.

Summary
1-7 Cursed were the persecutors of the believers burned with fire 
8-9 The believers persecuted for their faith in God
10-12 For the infidels is hell-fire, but for believers Paradise
13-16 God is Creator and Sovereign Ruler of the universe
17-20 Pharaoh and Thamúd examples to warn those who reject the Quran
21 The glorious Quran is kept in the Preserved Table 

The surah opens with an oath by a heaven full of stars: by the sky containing great stars.

Exegesis

4-8 People of the Ditch

Interpreters give several different versions of the story to be referred to in verses 4–8: persecution of Christians by Dhu Nuwas in Yemen, persecutions by Nebuchadnezzar, and people of the trench. It has been documented that Dun Nuwas burned 20,000 Christians alive in a burning trench because they refused to convert to Judaism.

22 The 'preserved tablet' 
Quranic exegetes produced different interpretations of the term 'preserved tablet' in verse 22. In this surah the relationship of Quran to the 'Preserved Tablet' is correlated with the relation of the stars 'Al-Buruj' to the heavens 'Al-Sama'. Some of the Mu'tazila argued that revelations were created initially in the preserved tablet. The 'Preserved Tablet' seems to be close to another term, 'Mother of all books' (umm al-kitab), mentioned in Ar-Ra'd 13:39 and Az-Zukhruf 43:4.

Theme and subject matter
Its theme is to warn the disbelievers of the evil consequences of the persecution and tyranny that they were perpetrating on the converts to Islam, and to console the believers, so as to say: "If you remain firm and steadfast against tyranny and coercion, you will be rewarded richly for it, and Allah will certainly avenge Himself on your persecutors on your behalf."

In this connection, the story of the People of the Ditch (ashab al-ukhdud) had been related, who were a group of people who had burnt believers to death by casting them into pits full of fire. By means of this story the believers and the disbelievers have been taught a few lessons. Firstly, that just as the People of the Ditch became worthy of Allah's curse and punishment due to their oppression and tyranny, the chiefs of Makkah are also becoming worthy of it. Secondly, that just as the believers at that time had willingly accepted to sacrifice their lives by being burnt to death in the pits of fire instead of turning away from the faith, so also the believers now should endure every persecution but should never give up their faith. Thirdly, that God's acknowledging Whom displeases the disbelievers and is urged on by the believers, is Dominant and Master of the Kingdom of the earth and heavens; He is self-praiseworthy and is watching what the two groups are striving for. Therefore, it is certain that the disbelievers will be punished in Hell for their oppression, tyranny, and cruelties, unless they have asked for sincere repentance. Likewise, it is also certain that those who believe and do good deeds will go to Paradise, and this indeed is the supreme success. Then the disbelievers have been warned, so as to say: "God's grip is very severe. If you are proud of the strength of your leaders, then you should know that the leaders in the time of the Pharaoh and Thamud were even stronger and more numerous. Therefore, you should learn a lesson from the fate they met. God's power has so encompassed you that you cannot escape His encirclement, and the Qur'an that you are bent upon belying, is unchangeable: it is inscribed in the Preserved Tablet, which cannot be corrupted in any way."

Hadith
Ibn 'Abbas, Mujahid, Ad-Dahhaj, Al-Hasan al-Basri, Qatadah and As-Suddi said Burj means stars. Ibn Jareer chose the view that it means the positions of the sun and the moon, which are twelve Burooj. The sun travels through each one of these Burj in one month. The moon travels through each one of these Burj in two-and-a-third days, which makes a total of twenty-eight positions, and it is hidden for two nights [making a month of 30 approximately].

References

External links
Quran 85 Clear Quran translation

 Part 1 of 2 by Nouman Ali Khan
 Part 2 of 2 by Nouman Ali Khan

Burooj
Islamic eschatology
Islamic belief and doctrine
Islamic ethics
Afterlife